Worms is an artillery turn-based tactics video game developed by Team17. It was released for the Xbox 360, PlayStation 3 and iOS platforms. The game is largely a port of 2006's Worms: Open Warfare.

Gameplay 
Players control a small platoon of worms across a deformable landscape, battling computer or player controlled teams. The game features bright and humorous cartoon-style animation and a varied arsenal of weapons. Full voice communication is also available among the players of the game. The game includes a tutorial, single-player challenges, and competitive multiplayer for up to four teams either online or offline.

There is also a Quick Start option (choice of Beginner, Intermediate or Pro, uses default schemes and teams). If the player wanted to play a custom singleplayer game, they have to select multiplayer and then create a local game with AI opponents.

The time it takes to complete a challenge is saved and the best times are displayed on a leaderboard.

Multiplayer features competitive play for up to four teams. It is compatible for both offline or online play via Xbox Live or PlayStation Network.

Development and release 
The development and release of the Xbox 360 version of Worms was significantly delayed due to a disagreement during the certification process prior to release, over the requirement of an in-game means of providing opposing player feedback in post-game lobbies.

Reception 

Worms received "generally favorable" reviews according to the review aggregating website Metacritic.

References

External links
 

2007 video games
Artillery video games
IOS games
Microsoft games
PlayStation 3 games
PlayStation Network games
Sony Interactive Entertainment games
Strategy video games
Symbian games
Video games developed in the United Kingdom
 09
Xbox 360 games
Xbox 360 Live Arcade games